The 1995–96 Turkish Cup was the 34th edition of the tournament that determined the association football Süper Lig Turkish Cup champion under the auspices of the Turkish Football Federation (TFF). champion under the auspices of the Turkish Football Federation (TFF). Galatasaray successfully contested Fenerbahçe on both legs of the finals. The results of the tournament also determined which clubs would be promoted or relegated.

Legacy
Graeme Souness planting the Galatasaray  flag after defeating their bitter rivals Fenerbahce in the final is part of Turkish football history.

First round

{{OneLegResult|'Mustafakemalpaşaspor||3–2 (aet)|İzmirspor}}

Second round

			

Third round

Fourth round

Fifth round

Sixth round

	

Quarter-finals

Semi-finals
Summary table

|}

1st leg

2nd leg

Final

1st leg

2nd legGalatasaray won 2–1 on aggregate.''

See also
 1995–96 1.Lig

References

Turkish Cup seasons
Cup
Turkish